Pseudonocardia parietis is a bacterium from the genus of Pseudonocardia which has been isolated from a wall which was colonized with mould in Stuttgart in Germany.

It is a bacterium that is Gram-positive, rod-shaped, spore-negative and is also a mycelium forming actinobacterium. It was found to have a 16s rRNA gene sequence and was shown to belong to the Pseudonocardiaceae family. It is most closely related to Pseudonocardia antarctica and Pseudonocardia alni.

References

Pseudonocardia
Bacteria described in 2009